Everingham is a village in the East Riding of Yorkshire, England.

Everingham may also refer to:

 Baron Everingham, 14th Century English Barony
 Everingham (surname)
 Everingham and Harswell
 HMS Everingham (M2626)